Coleophora alhamaella is a moth of the family Coleophoridae. It is found in Spain.

References

alhamaella
Moths described in 1980
Moths of Europe